Arthur Westland Rees (9 September 1866 – 1 January 1921) was a New Zealand cricketer. He played first-class cricket for Auckland and Hawke's Bay between 1889 and 1897. In his first two first-class matches he took 25 wickets.

Life and career
Rees's father was William Lee Rees, who was a cousin of W. G. Grace and other members of the Grace and Gilbert families. Arthur Rees was born in Hokitika and educated at Auckland Grammar School before going to Caius College, Cambridge. He returned to New Zealand in 1889 and was admitted as a barrister and solicitor in 1890. He established a law practice in Gisborne in 1893.
 
A left-arm slow bowler, Rees took 32 wickets for 226 in the three matches of Auckland's southern tour in 1889–90. He began with 6 for 27 and 8 for 36 against Otago, bowling unchanged on his first-class debut, and a few days later he took 7 for 35 and 4 for 63 against Canterbury. He was the leading bowler in New Zealand that season, with 38 wickets at an average of 10.94.

Rees married Mabel Margaret Crawford in Gisborne in May 1893. He died at his home in Gisborne early on New Year's Day 1921 after a short illness. His wife, a son and three daughters survived him.

See also
 List of Auckland representative cricketers

References

External links
 

1866 births
1921 deaths
People educated at Auckland Grammar School
Alumni of Gonville and Caius College, Cambridge
New Zealand cricketers
Auckland cricketers
Hawke's Bay cricketers
People from Hokitika
Grace family
19th-century New Zealand lawyers
20th-century New Zealand lawyers